Edward Price Bell (March 1, 1869 – 1943) was a Chicago journalist, best known for his work with the Chicago Daily News. He began his career as a newsman at the Terre Haute Evening Gazette at the age of 13. After attending Wabash College, he married May Alice Mills in 1897 and moved to Chicago in 1898, where he wrote for the Chicago Record Herald. Shortly thereafter, he was transferred to London as a foreign correspondent for the Record and then the Chicago Daily News, where he served for 20 years.

Bell covered U.S. President Herbert Hoover's good will tour through Latin America, and developed a strong friendship with Hoover. He used this close relationship to the advantage of British-American relations by organizing the London Naval Conference and Treaty, attended and signed by President Hoover and UK Prime Minister Ramsay MacDonald in 1930. Bell was nominated for a Nobel Peace Prize due to his role in this conference.

Bell died in 1943 at his home in Pass Christian, Mississippi of complications of Beriberi.

External links
 Edward Price Bell Papers at Newberry Library

Further reading
Hamilton, John M. (2009) Journalism's Roving Eye: A History of American Foreign Reporting. Louisiana State University Press.

1869 births
1943 deaths
Journalists from Illinois
Chicago Daily News people
Wabash College alumni